This is a list of The Generals of the Yang Family characters. While some characters are historical, their stories have been fictionalized. Due to the existence of multiple versions (novels, regional Chinese opera, pingshu and screen adaptations) of the saga, some fictional characters are either omitted completely or take on a different name in a given version.

The Yang family

Yang Wenguang's son is generally known as Yang Huaiyu (楊懷玉) in sequels.

Historical supporting characters
As Generals of the Yang Family is a historical saga, many of the supporting characters are historical characters. The ones that frequently reappear in adaptations include Emperor Taizong of Song, Kou Zhun, Huyan Zan and Zhao Defang of the Song dynasty, and Empress Xiao Yanyan of the Liao dynasty.

Song dynasty
Emperor Taizu or Zhao Kuangyin (趙匡胤), 1st emperor, reigning from 960 to 976
Emperor Taizong or Zhao Guangyi (趙光義), 2nd emperor, reigning from 976 to 997
Emperor Zhenzong or Zhao Heng (趙恆), 3rd emperor, reigning from 997 to 1022
Emperor Renzong or Zhao Zhen (趙禎), 4th emperor, reigning from 1022 to 1063
others

Bao Zheng (包拯)
Dang Jin (黨進)
Di Qing (狄青)
Fan Zhongyan (范仲淹)
Gao Huaide (高懷德)
He Huaipu (賀懷浦)
Huyan Zan (呼延贊)
Kou Zhun (寇準)
Lu Duoxun (盧多遜)
Lü Mengzheng (呂蒙正)
Wang Gui (王貴)
Wang Shen (王侁)
Yang Guangmei (楊光美)
Zhang Qixian (張齊賢)
Zhao Defang (趙德芳)
Zhao Dezhao (趙德昭)
Zhao Pu (趙普)

Liao dynasty
Emperor Jingzong,
Empress Xiao Yanyan
Emperor Shengzong,
Others

Xiao Chuoli
Xiao Talin
Yelü Boguzhe
Yelü Sha
Yelü Xidi
Yelü Xiezhen
Yelü Xiuge
Yelü Xuegu

Fictional supporting characters

Mythological characters
Jade Emperor
Lü Dongbin
Zhongli Quan

Others
Female characters are in pink.

References

Sources
Primary
  
  
  
  
Secondary
 
 

Characters
Generals of the Yang Family
Generals of the Yang Family characters